Marsdenia elliptica, the jungle netvine, is a species of flowering plant in the family Apocynaceae. It is endemic to forests in Puerto Rico.

References

elliptica
Endemic flora of Puerto Rico
Flora without expected TNC conservation status